William of Breteuil was Benedictine abbot of Breteuil, near Beauvais, France. He rebuilt the monastery after it had been nearly destroyed by the Normans.

He was the eldest son of William FitzOsbern, 1st Earl of Hereford. He was held captive and tortured by Ascelin Gouel, Sire d'Yvry, until he finally granted his daughter Isabella de Breteuil's hand in marriage to him.

Issue
Both of William's children were illegitimate

 Eustace de Breteuil, married Juliane FitzRoy
 Isabel de Breteuil, married Ascelin Gouel d'Yvry

Notes

French Roman Catholic saints
12th-century Christian saints
1130 deaths
French Benedictines
Year of birth unknown